Yaron Ben-Dov (11 January 1970 – 6 January 2017) was an Israeli football player. He died on 6 January 2017. He was 46 years old.

Footnotes

1970 births
2017 deaths
Jewish Israeli sportspeople
Israel international footballers
Israeli footballers
Maccabi Netanya F.C. players
Hapoel Tel Aviv F.C. players
Hapoel Rishon LeZion F.C. players
Liga Leumit players
Association football defenders